Niranj Suresh (born 1990) is an Indian musician, playback singer, Composer and actor. Niranj is the lead vocalist of the Indian rock bands Motherjane and Nemesis. He is also the lead vocalist and songwriter of a progressive rock band called Blank planet. He also started his own solo venture "Nrj Project" in 2017.
 
Niranj started his career in playback singing after singing in the movie Asha Black. In a short span of four years, Niranj has made his presence felt in the Malayalam music industry with his distinct vocal style and has also made his Tamil debut.

Personal life

Niranj Suresh was born in Edappally, Kerala in 1990. He is the eldest child of Dr. Suresh Narayanan, Physics Professor and Dr. Anila Suresh, Physics Professor and Research Guide at Union Christian College, Aluva and has a younger sibling Nikhil.A.Suresh. Niranj did his schooling from Bhavans Vidya Mandir, Elamakkara , Kochi and later Engineering course from Mar Athanasius College of Engineering, Kothamangalam.

He was a Junior Division NCC Cadet and bagged Chief Minister's gold medal for the best cadet of the state (2005). He also represented Kerala in the Republic day parade, Delhi (2005).

He got married in April 2018 in Kerala to Dr. Radhika Lal, an ENT specialist.

Career

He found his taste for music from his childhood days. During his college days, he was part of the college band and later joined a metal core band NEMESIS. In 2013, he joined Blank planet as their lead vocalist and songwriter. They released a single called MAYA on 23 December 2015 which was directed and edited by Niranj himself. They are currently working on their EP which is scheduled to release by 2017.

Niranj entered into Playback singing after singing for the film Asha Black. His vocals were noted after singing for the Malayalam film Thoppil Joppan which was a blues style rendition. He has sung for various music directors like Vidyasagar, Gopi Sundar, Shaan Rahman, Deepak Dev and Bijibal and has many hit songs under his name like "Thechille penne", "Innalekalil", "Roshomon", "Sa Re Ga Ma" followed by many more songs in recent Malayalam movies. He also made his debut in Tamil music under the guidance of Vishal Chandrasekhar, with the song "Pattikichu Pathiya" for the movie Kee.

Niranj's music ranges between a variety of genres like from Western music, blues, punk rock and Heavy metal music. He is currently working on his solo album which is about to get released soon

Discography

Films

Albums

Awards

References

External links 
 
 
 

1990 births
Living people
Indian male playback singers
Indian male singers
Singers from Kochi
Malayalam playback singers
Film musicians from Kerala
Male actors from Kochi
Indian male film actors
Male actors in Malayalam cinema